Ras-related protein Rab-27A is a protein that in humans is encoded by the RAB27A gene.

Function 

The protein encoded by this gene belongs to the small GTPase superfamily, Rab family. The protein is membrane-bound and may be involved in protein transport and small GTPase mediated signal transduction. Mutations in this gene are associated with Griscelli syndrome type 2 and hemophagocytic lymphohistiocytosis. Alternative splicing occurs at this locus and four transcript variants encoding the same protein have been identified.

The RAB27A gene is regulated by the Microphthalmia-associated transcription factor.

Interactions
RAB27A has been shown to interact with:

 EXPH5, 
 MYO5A, 
 RPH3AL 
 SYTL1,  and
 SYTL2.

See also
 Rab27

References

Further reading